The seventh season of the American competitive television series BattleBots premiered on ABC on June 23, 2016 and concluded on September 1, 2016. It was the second season since the show was rebooted in 2015, and was the last season to be broadcast on ABC.

In November 2015, ABC announced that it had renewed the BattleBots revival for a second season, featuring an expansion to a 32-team field.

Former UFC fighter Kenny Florian and MLB/NFL Sportscaster Chris Rose returned from last season to host this second season of BattleBots on ABC.  Also returning from last season were Faruq Tauheed as the arena announcer and Alison Haislip as the sideline and behind the scenes reporter.  Molly McGrath has been replaced by Samantha Ponder as the presenter.

Robots in season 7, as in season 6, competed in one 250-pound weight class, as opposed to the multiple weight classes in seasons 1–5.

Judges
Judging the matches for this season were former BattleBots competitor and special effects artist Fon Davis, the face of Nerdist, Jessica Chobot, and new judge, Marvel's Agents of S.H.I.E.L.D. actor Clark Gregg, as well as celebrity guest judges MythBusters host Adam Savage (episode 2), NFL tightend Vernon Davis (episode 6), and Vsauce creator Michael Stevens (episode 7).

Contestants

This season saw teams from six different countries competing with their robots. Four from Canada, five from the United Kingdom, and one each from Australia, France and Brazil.  Competitors from the U.S. hail from fourteen different states from Florida down south, all the way up to Alaska.

Pre-qualifying
Of the 48 available spots, 44 robots were chosen by the selection committee. However, they could not agree on the last four spots out of 12 evenly matched bots. During this pre-qualifying round, those 12 teams faced off in a "Rumble," where three bots entered the arena together and battled in a single 3-minute round without hazards. Only one bot from each rumble moved on to the Qualifying round. This round of the competition aired on May 10, 2016, as a special episode before the season began. Although 44 robots were chosen to go to qualifying automatically, one had mechanical problems and was replaced by a wildcard pick from the pre-qualifying losers.

 The robot was the winner of the rumble and moved on to the Qualifying Round.
 These robots were the losers of the rumble and were eliminated.
 This robot was passed through pre-qualifying to qualifying as a last minute replacement for a robot with mechanical issues.
KO: Knockout
UD: Unanimous Decision
SD: Split Decision

Qualifying

The 48 qualified robots battle against elimination. The 24 winning robots advance to the round of 32, the 24 losing robots are admitted to the wildcard pool, in which eight will also advance to the round of 32 on July 7, 2016.

 The robot was the winner of the battle and moved on to the Round of 32.
 The robot was chosen as a "Wildcard" pick and moved on to the Round of 32.
 The robot was the loser of the battle and was eliminated.
KO: Knockout
UD: Unanimous Decision
SD: Split Decision

Tournament

Seeding
Tombstone
Bronco
Witch Doctor
Bite Force
Stinger
Son of Whyachi
Minotaur
Icewave
Beta
Complete Control
Hypershock
Yeti
Chomp
Cobalt
Razorback
Brutus
Lock-Jaw*
Ghost Raptor*
Bombshell*
Captain Shrederator
Lucky*
Warrior Clan
Warhead
Overhaul*
Nightmare*
Blacksmith*
Poison Arrow
Mega Tento*
The Ringmaster
Red Devil
Chrome Fly
Escape Velocity

<small>* = Robots that have been awarded a Wildcard

KO: Knockout
UD: Unanimous Decision
SD: Split Decision

Round of 32

 The robot was the winner of the battle and moved on to the Round of 16.
 The robot was the loser of the battle and was eliminated.
KO: Knockout
UD: Unanimous Decision
SD: Split Decision

Round of 16

 The robot was the winner of the battle and moved on to the Quarterfinals.
 The robot was the loser of the battle and was eliminated.
KO: Knockout
UD: Unanimous Decision
SD: Split Decision

Quarterfinals

 The robot was the winner of the battle and moved on to the Semifinals.
 The robot was the loser of the battle and was eliminated.
KO: Knockout
UD: Unanimous Decision
SD: Split Decision

Semifinals

 The robot was the winner of the battle and moved on to the Final.
 The robot was the loser of the battle and was eliminated.
KO: Knockout
UD: Unanimous Decision
SD: Split Decision

Non-Tournament Rumble

A special fan-favorite rumble took place in episode 10 alongside the Semifinals and the Final.

 The robot was the winner of the rumble.
 These robots were the losers of the rumble.
KO: Knockout
UD: Unanimous Decision
SD: Split Decision

Final

 The robot was the winner of the battle and became the champion of BattleBots 2016.
 The robot was the loser of the battle and became the runner-up of BattleBots 2016.
KO: Knockout
UD: Unanimous Decision
SD: Split Decision

Episodes

References

2016 American television seasons
BattleBots